Raphitoma petanii is a species of sea snail, a marine gastropod mollusk in the family Raphitomidae.

Distribution
This marine species occurs in the Croatian part of the Adriatic Sea.

References

 Hoarau A. & Horst D. (2020). Les genres Cyrillia, Leufroyia & Raphitoma vivants de Méditerranée française. AFC, Paris, and ConchBooks, Hackenheim, 98 pp.

External links
 http://zoosystema.com/42/16 Prkić J., Giannuzzi-Savelli R., Pusateri F., Russini V., Fassio G. & Oliverio M. (2020). Three new species of Raphitoma Bellardi, 1847 (Mollusca, Gastropoda, Raphitomidae) from Croatian waters (NE Adriatic Sea). Zoosystema. 42(16): 215-237

petanii
Gastropods described in 2020